Umchung is a census village in West Sikkim district, Sikkim, India. According to the 2011 Census of India, Umchung village has a total population of 2,035 people including 1,050 males and 985 females.

References 

Villages in Gyalshing district